Davin Pierre is a baseball coach and former player, who is the current head baseball coach of the Grambling State Tigers. He played college baseball at Grambling State from 2002 to 2005 for head coach James Randall.

Playing career
Pierre attended Grambling State University, where he played baseball.

Coaching career
Pierre joined the Tigers baseball staff as an assistant in 2009.
On November 10, 2021, Pierre was promoted to interim head coach following the resignation of James Cooper. He was promoted to head coach on October 21, 2022.

Head coaching record

References

External links
Grambling State Tigers bio

Living people
Grambling State Tigers baseball coaches
Grambling State Tigers baseball players
Year of birth missing (living people)
African-American baseball coaches